Keiferia dalibori is a moth in the family Gelechiidae. It was described by King and Montesinos in 2012. It is found in southern Chile.

References

Keiferia
Moths described in 2012
Endemic fauna of Chile